Asperula scoparia is a species of flowering plant in the family Rubiaceae. It was first described in 1847 and is endemic to Tasmania, Victoria and New South Wales in Australia.

References 

scoparia
Taxa named by Joseph Dalton Hooker